"Cómo sé" is a song written by the Mexican singer Julieta Venegas and included in her album debut, Here.

The song was written by Julieta Venegas and produced by Gustavo Santaolalla. It was released as her second single in 1997.

Song 
It was written by Julieta Venegas. It treats on the culmination of a loving relation, and the as it is preferable the leave side this if the contraparte already did it. In 2007 it made a new version for his album MTV Unplugged, with the participation of Jaques Morelenbaum touching the Cello.

Video musical 
The video begins with a girl that finds playing with his casita of toy and see three dolls of cardboard (that they are three Julietas), and the girl goes planting a grimace dressed like a Jewish and begins to sing without having movement the doll and afterwards adds the band and v changing continuously of doll and at the end puts a bed, a case and a car in which Julieta goes up and goes .

Smart of songs 
 CD Single/Promo
 Cómo sé

Prizes and nominations 
 MTV Video Music Awards
 "Better Feminine Interpretation"

References

External links 
  Video Official
  Version MTV Unplugged

Julieta Venegas songs
Spanish-language songs
1998 singles
1997 songs
Songs written by Julieta Venegas